Board of Investment (BOI) is the premier investment promotion agency of Pakistan working under the administrative control of the Prime Minister’s Office and is mandated to promote and facilitate both local & foreign investment. The Board of Investment is a member of the World Association of Investment Promotion Agencies (WAIPA).

Pakistan offers a variety of attractive opportunities for both local & foreign investors. The country is geo-strategically placed at the crossroads of Asia; in geographical terms it is strategically located among landlocked central Asian states, thriving China, resource rich Middle East and huge markets of South East Asia. It has been a center of attraction for the developed economies to invest for lucrative returns. There are ample reasons for the business community to opt for Pakistan having business friendly environment and liberal economic policies to growing infrastructure.

Ease of doing business 
According to the World Bank’s Doing Business Report, 2020, Pakistan is No. 1 in terms of big jump in ranking of Ease of Doing Business (EoDB) among 11 biggest economies. Pakistan is the top reformer in the South Asia and among the top 20 reformers in Ease of Doing Business Reforms (EoDB). The reforms were recognized in the fields of starting a business, trade across borders, getting electricity, dealing with construction permits, registering properties and paying taxes.

The next step is to cut out redundant regulations & remove unnecessary permissions/ NOCs & inspections under BOI's new initiative called “Better Business Regulatory Initiative".

Structure

Departments and wings 

 Investment Promotion Wing (IP)
Ease of Doing Business and Better Business Regulatory Initiative Wing (EoDB / BBRI)
Project Management Unit (PMU), China Pakistan Economic Corridor (CPEC) Industrial Cooperation
Special Economic Zones Wing (SEZs) 
Administration & Management Information System Wing (Admin/MIS)
 Investment Policy, Legal & Research (PLR)
 Facilitation Wing
 Regional Offices

Services 
The wide range of professional services provided by Board of Investment includes disseminating information on the opportunities for investment and facilitating companies that are looking for project sites, joint venture partners and other resources. It promotes Pakistan as an investment destination through networking, conferences and events, media relations, Pakistan’s diplomatic missions abroad, and thought leadership.

The Board of Investment acts as a focal point of contact for prospective investors, both domestic and foreign to provide them with all necessary information and assistance in coordinating with other Government Departments/Agencies.

The Board of Investment also evaluates applications of investors for the Work / Business Visa, Branch / Liaison Office and Airport Entry Passes.

Contacting Board of Investment 
Board of Investment's global network will show companies why Pakistan is an ideal strategic choice for growth. By contacting the nearest Pakistani Embassy, High Commission, or Consulate, a company can get the information and assistance they need to make the right decisions.

Business leaders from across the globe work with the Board of Investment as "Honorary Investment Counsellors". They promote Pakistan internationally and highlight investment opportunities but also offer business experience and knowledge gained across a range of sectors and geographical markets.

The Board of Investment has specialist staff located at the head office in Islamabad along with offices in each of Pakistan’s four provinces.

See also
Investment promotion agency

References

External links 

Pakistan federal departments and agencies
Foreign relations of Pakistan
Investment companies of Pakistan
Investment promotion agencies
1992 establishments in Pakistan
Government agencies established in 1992